Friðrik Þór Friðriksson (born 12 May 1954; pronounced ), sometimes credited as Fridrik Thor Fridriksson, is an Icelandic film director and producer.

Biography

Fridriksson started his film making career with experimental films and documentaries in the early 1980s. In 1987, he founded The Icelandic Film Corporation that became Iceland's most important film production company. The company produces his films and works with other Icelandic directors as well as producers. His international reputation led the company to build a network of internationally well-established co-production partner companies, including Lars von Trier's Zentropa and Francis Ford Coppola's American Zoetrope.

He made his debut as a film director with Skytturnar (White Whales) in 1987. His second feature Children of Nature (1991) was nominated for an Oscar as Best Foreign Language Film (it was also Iceland's first nomination in this category). Children of Nature took the Grand Prize at the 4th Yubari International Fantastic Film Festival in February 1993.

Friðrik also starred in Lars von Trier'''s 2006 comedy film The Boss of It All.

In 2010, he made a documentary A Mother's Courage: Talking Back to Autism and a feature film Mamma Gógó; both premiered at the Toronto International Film Festival.A Mother's Courage: Talking Back to Autism was nominated for the Voice award in 2010.

In 2015, together with Bergur Bernburg he co-directed Sjóndeildarhringur (Horizon), a documentary about Georg Guðni Hauksson, which premiered at Toronto International Film Festival.

Style
He grew up in Iceland and was largely influenced by American films. Despite that, it was exposure to the work of Akira Kurosawa, John Ford and Nicholas Ray which proved crucial in his decision to become a filmmaker. He has worked with two of Iceland's most acclaimed novelists and script-writers. His work with Einar Már Guðmundsson includes Children Of Nature, Angels of the Universe, and Movie Days. His work with Einar Kárason includes White Whales, Devil's Island, and Falcons''.

Friðriksson is noted for the strong visual style of his films, including stunning images. These films are both deeply personal and strongly rooted in the culture of Iceland, often depicting characters at the crossroads of tradition and modernity. They are said to combine a wry sense of humour with a genuine solidarity with the characters.

Personal life
Friðriksson is interested in football and is a devoted fan of the Fram Reykjavík team.

Filmography

References

External links 
 
 Icelandic Film corporation

1954 births
Living people
Fridrik Thor Fridriksson
Fridrik Thor Fridriksson
Fridrik Thor Fridriksson